Temple Sowerby is a village and civil parish in Cumbria, northern England. At the 2011 census Temple Sowerby was grouped with Newbiggin giving a total population of 528.

At the centre of the village is the village green surrounded by cottages and houses, the village hall, Church of England primary school and a public house and hotel. Just outside the village stands the cricket pitch, a bowling green, the new doctors surgery and the Temple Sowerby garage. The National Trust property Acorn Bank is nearby, which dates back to the days of the crusades when a member of the Knights Templar lived there. The village's association with the Knights Templar gave it the name 'Temple'. Sowerby is Viking for "a homestead with poor soil".

Transport

Railway
Temple Sowerby railway station (now a private house) was on the Eden Valley Railway between Cliburn and Kirkby Thore.

Road
The villagers of Temple Sowerby successfully campaigned for a bypass for the village Construction began in the spring of 2006 and it was officially opened on Thursday 18 October 2007. There was a celebratory walk of the bypass route on Sunday 16 September 2007, allowing a unique opportunity to walk along the route before it was opened to traffic. The walk was extremely successful, with more than 500 people taking part.

See also

Listed buildings in Temple Sowerby

References

External links

 Cumbria County History Trust: Temple Sowerby (nb: provisional research only – see Talk page)
Temple Sowerby Website
Temple Sowerby Bypass Celebration website
Railway station site record

Villages in Cumbria
Civil parishes in Cumbria